AYC is an acronym for any of the following articles:

 African Youth Charter
 All Youth Channels
 American Youth Congress
 Adventist Youth Conference
 Active Yaw Control, Mitsubishi Motors' automotive technology
 Ameson Year in China, a program run by Ameson Education and Cultural Exchange Foundation